Gustav-Adolf Moths (born 21 September 1877 in Hamburg, date of death unknown) was a German rower who competed in the 1900 Summer Olympics. He was the coxswain  with the German crew in the coxed four A semi-final, but he did not compete in the final. However the IOC medal database credits the bronze medal to him and not to Max Ammermann, who participated in the final.

References

External links

1877 births
Year of death missing
Coxswains (rowing)
Olympic rowers of Germany
Rowers at the 1900 Summer Olympics
Olympic bronze medalists for Germany
Olympic medalists in rowing
German male rowers
Medalists at the 1900 Summer Olympics
Place of death missing
Rowers from Hamburg